Officially the Toronto Rape Crisis Centre / Multicultural Women Against Rape, but usually referred to as the Toronto Rape Crisis Centre and abbreviated to TRCC, is the only rape crisis centre in Toronto, Ontario.

It runs a 24/7 crisis line and provides free counselling, and is one of 42 rape crisis centers in the province of Ontario.

History 
In the mid 1990s, the TRCC highlighted the issue of gender based violence at Pride Toronto.

In 2018, the TRCC saw an increase in demand for services following reporting on the Harvey Weinstein sexual abuse cases.

In 2019, the TRCC received $1m from the Ontario Government, 25% of what had been promised to them. The wait time for services reached 15 months in 2019.

See also 

 Rape crisis center
 Ottawa Rape Crisis Centre
 Domestic violence

References

External link 

 Official website

Sexual abuse advocacy and support groups
Anti-racist organizations in Canada
Feminism in Ontario
Feminist organizations in Canada
Organizations based in Toronto
Rape in Canada
Women in Toronto